

Events

May events
May 5 – The first steam-worked passenger railway in continental Europe is opened, covering the 23 km between Brussels and Mechelen in Belgium.

June events 
 June 27 – Boston and Maine Railroad is chartered in New Hampshire.

July events
 July 4 – Baltimore and Ohio Railroad's Thomas Viaduct, the first multiple arch stone masonry railroad bridge in the United States, is officially completed. It is also the longest bridge of any kind in the nation, and second longest in the world, next to London Bridge.

August events
 August 25 – The Baltimore and Ohio Railroad opens its line between Baltimore, Maryland, and Washington, DC.
 August 31 – The Great Western Railway of England is incorporated by Act of Parliament.

October events
 October 1 – Promoters of the Bristol and Exeter Railway in the south west of England issue a prospectus for the railway's construction.
 October - James G. King succeeds Eleazer Lord as president of the Erie Railroad.

December events

 7 December – Germany's first railroad, the Bayerische Ludwigsbahn, starts regular passenger train service over a distance of 6 km (3¾ miles) between the neighboring cities of Nuremberg and Fürth using a steam locomotive named Adler ("Eagle").
 December – The Wilmington and Raleigh Railroad in North Carolina receives an amending charter.

Unknown date events
 The first steam locomotive assembled by Rogers Locomotive and Machine Works, the McNeil, manufactured by Robert Stephenson and Company, operates on the Paterson and Hudson River Railroad.

Births

March births
 March 28 – Matthias N. Forney, American steam locomotive manufacturer (d. 1908).

April births
 April 2 – Jacob Nash Victor, oversaw construction for California Southern Railroad from San Diego through Cajon Pass to Barstow, California (d. 1907).
 April 10 – Henry Villard, president of Northern Pacific Railroad (d. 1900).

May births
 May 27 – Charles Francis Adams, Jr., president of Union Pacific Railroad 1884–1890 (d. 1915).

June births
 June 27 – Fred Harvey (entrepreneur) who developed the Harvey House chain of restaurants and hotels serving passengers of the Atchison, Topeka and Santa Fe Railway (d. 1901).

November births
 November 25 – Andrew Carnegie, steel magnate and owner of Pittsburgh Locomotive and Car Works (d. 1919).

Deaths

References

 (May 3, 2005), Brief Biographies of Major Mechanical Engineers. Retrieved June 29, 2005.
 Rivanna Chapter National Railway Historical Society (2005), This month in railroad history – August. Retrieved August 23, 2005.